Renso Pérez (born 24 December 1987) is an Argentine professional footballer who plays as a midfielder for Guillermo Brown.

Career
Pérez's career started with Primera D club Sportivo Barracas, who he remained with for three years before joining Torneo Argentino B side Atlético Policial. His stay with Atlético Policial lasted just a season as he was soon on the move again as he completed a transfer to Primera C team Villa Dálmine. He won the 2011–12 Primera C Metropolitana title in his debut season with the club. He scored eight goals in thirty-six appearances in his next season for Villa Dálmine in the 2012–13 Primera B Metropolitana before he departed in 2013 to join Primera B Nacional side Ferro Carril Oeste on loan.

He scored his first goal for Ferro in his third match, versus Atlético Tucumán. In total, he played in twenty-six league games. Pérez returned to Villa Dálmine and went on to play eighty-five times and score sixteen goals for them, including three goals in twenty-four appearances in their 2014 promotion-winning season. In July 2016, Pérez joined Argentine Primera División team Arsenal de Sarandí on loan. He made his Arsenal and top-flight debut on 27 August against Sarmiento. In his next game, on 13 September, he scored his first goal versus Atlético Tucumán; the same opponents he scored his first Ferro goal for.

Central Córdoba completed the signing of Pérez in June 2018. He netted in his opening appearance, scoring as the club eliminated Primera División team Vélez Sarsfield out of the Copa Argentina.

Career statistics
.

|Villa Dalmine
|2023-Actualidad

Honours
Villa Dálmine
 Primera C Metropolitana: 2011–12

References

External links

1987 births
Living people
Sportspeople from Buenos Aires Province
Argentine footballers
Association football midfielders
Primera Nacional players
Argentine Primera División players
Villa Dálmine footballers
Ferro Carril Oeste footballers
Arsenal de Sarandí footballers
Central Córdoba de Santiago del Estero footballers
Atlético de Rafaela footballers
Club Agropecuario Argentino players
Guillermo Brown de Puerto Madryn footballers